Nar Phu, or ’Narpa, is a Sino-Tibetan variety spoken in the two villages of Nar and Phu, in the Valley of the Nar Khola in the Manang district of Nepal. It forms a dialect continuum with Manang and may be intelligible with it; however, the Nar and Phu share a secret language to confound Gyasumdo and Manang who would otherwise understand them.

Phonology

Vowels

The language lacks all middle vowels and the open mid vowel /ɔ/.

Consonants

Comparatively to the English language, the /g/ is not in the language.

Tones
Nar Phu distinguishes four tones: high falling, high level, low rising murmured, and mid/low falling murmured.

Language Patterns 
Nar-Phu has a different vowel system than other Tamangic languages, due to the amount of front vowels.​ Nar-Phu is a four-tone language. Tones 1 and 4 are falling; tones 3 and 4 are murmured. Tone 2 is distinguished by its clear, high quality.​ Nar-Phu has no formal gendered language system, but some suffixes are used to describe animals, even castrated male animals. Honorific Noun phrases are used when there is not a noun in place for said words.

Swadesh List 

 čhipruŋ - Nar
 ŋêe min - my name is 
 cɦecuke - children
 tɦosor - happy/happier/happiness
 læ̂se/yarcʌkômpʌ - Yarsagompa
 šiŋ - wood
 kɦêpɛ - eighth month
 ɦyâŋi - yaks
 momori - momo
 kɦeskʌ - gas
 læ̂pa - cup
 bɦaʈʈi - hotel
 eki - again
 mɦi - dies
 molompapɛ - religious books
 molom - worship

[1]

References

Bibliography 
 Noonan, Michael (2003). "Nar-Phu" Sino-Tibetan Languages, edited by Randy LaPolla and Graham Thurgood, 336-352. London: Routledge.
 Kristine A. Hildebrandt (2013). “Converb and aspect marking polysemy in Nar” Responses to Language Endangerment: In Honor of Mickey Noonan, edited by Elena Mihas, Bernard Perley, Gabriel Rei-Doval, and Kathleen Wheatley, 97-117. Amsterdam: John Benjamins.
 Kristine A. Hildebrandt, D.N. Dhakal, Oliver Bond, Matt Vallejo and Andrea Fyffe. (2015). “A sociolinguistic survey of the languages of Manang, Nepal: Co-existence and endangerment.” NFDIN Journal, 14.6: 104-122.
Mandala collections. Nar-Phu | Mandala Collections - Audio-Video. (n.d.). Retrieved December 10, 2021, from https://av.mandala.library.virginia.edu/collection/nar-phu.

External links
Manang Languages Project of Kristine Hildebrandt
Nar Phu Valley Trekking Nepal
Nar-Phu language archive at the University of Virginia Tibetan and Himalayan Library

Tamangic languages
Languages of Nepal